Buon Huong Tan (born 10 March 1967) is a French politician formerly serving as the member of the National Assembly for the 9th constituency of Paris since 2017. A member of La République En Marche! (LREM), his constituency covers part of the 13th arrondissement. Tan lost his reelection bid in the 2022 French legislative election.

Family and youth
Tan arrived in France as a refugee from Cambodia in 1975, as his Chinese Cambodian family fled the Khmer Rouge. They settled in Tours, before he moved to Paris for his studies. He then joined his two sisters in working for their father's business.

Political career
In Parliament, Tan serves as member of the Committee on Foreign Affairs. In addition to his committee assignments, he is the president of the French-Chinese Parliamentary Friendship Group.

In a ranking published by Le Parisien in early 2021, Tan was ranked as one of the least active members of the National Assembly between 2017 and 2020, having participated in only 10 percent of all parliamentary votes.

In January 2022, Tan was the only deputy to vote against a cross-party resolution recognizing and condemning the “genocidal nature of the systematic political violence and crimes against humanity currently perpetrated by China against the Uyghurs.“

Buon Tan is a member of several Chinese Communist Party-affiliated groups, and has invited multiple Chinese ambassadors to France to give speeches to the National Assembly. In May 2019, he visited Beijing to attend a meeting of the Chinese Overseas Friendship Association and was photographed shaking the hand of General Secretary Xi Jinping.

See also
 2017 French legislative election

References

1967 births
Living people
Deputies of the 15th National Assembly of the French Fifth Republic
La République En Marche! politicians
People from Phnom Penh
Politicians from Paris
Councillors of Paris
Cambodian emigrants to France
French people of Chinese descent